Deir Jarir is a Palestinian agricultural town in the Ramallah and al-Bireh Governorate in the central West Bank, located  northeast of Ramallah. According to the Palestinian Central Bureau of Statistics (PCBS), Deir Jarir had a population of approximately 3,986 inhabitants in mid-year 2006.

Most of the land administered by the PNA is the city's built-up area and most of Deir Jarir's cultivated lands are grown with grape vines and fig and olive trees. Open-spaces make-up 76% of the town's area.

Location
It is bordered by Al Auja  to the east, Kafr Malik and Al Mazra'a ash Sharqiya to the north, Silwad to the west, and  Et Taiyiba to the south.

Name
The village name means "the monastery/house of Jerir", and is named, in the opinion of 19th-century orientalist E. H. Palmer, after the celebrated Arab poet Jarir.

History

Sherds from the Mamluk era have been found here. In 1354, in the Mamluk era, much of the revenue from Deir Jarir was given to a waqf in Jerusalem, to be used for the Khātūniyya Madrasa. In 1491-92, Deir Jarir yielded annually 3,800 aspers in revenue to this madrasa.

Ottoman period
In 1517, Deir Jarir was incorporated into the Ottoman Empire with the rest of Palestine, and in 1596 it appeared  (with the name Dar Jarir) in the tax registers as being in the nahiya of Quds in the liwa of Quds. It had a population of 23 households, all Muslim. Taxes were paid on wheat, barley, olives, vineyards, fruit trees, occasional revenues, goats and/or bee hives; a total of 4,300 akçe. Shards from the early Ottoman era have also been found.

In 1838 it was noted as Deir Jureir, a Muslim village, located in the Beni Murrah region, north of Jerusalem.

The French explorer Victor Guérin visited the village in 1863 and in 1870, and he found it having about 200 inhabitants.

An Ottoman village list of about 1870 indicated 111 houses and a population of 394, though the population count included men only.

In 1882, the PEF's Survey of Western Palestine described Dar Jerir as "A village of moderate size, with ancient tombs to the south, and a spring to the west; a few olives on the same side."

In 1896 the population of Deir Jarir was estimated to be about 828 persons.

British Mandate
In the 1922 census of Palestine, conducted by the British Mandate authorities, the village, named Dair Ijreer, had a population of 739, all Muslim. In the 1931 census the population of Deir Jarir was a total of 847, still entirely Muslim, in 172 inhabited houses.

In the 1945 statistics, the population of Deir Jarir was 1,080, all Muslims, who owned  of land according to an official land and population survey. 3,091 dunams were plantations and irrigable land, 6,499 used for cereals, while  were built-up (urban) land.

Jordanian period
In the wake of the 1948 Arab–Israeli War, and after the 1949 Armistice Agreements, Deir Jarir came under Jordanian rule. It was annexed by Jordan in 1950.

The Jordanian census of 1961 found 1,474 inhabitants in Deir Jarir.

1967-present
Since the Six-Day War in 1967, Deir Jarir has been under Israeli occupation. The population of Deir Jerir in the 1967 census conducted by the Israeli authorities was 1,275, 18 of whom originated from the Israeli territory.

After the 1995 accords, 15% of village land was classified as Area B, the remaining 85% as Area C. Israel has confiscated 1,264 of dunams of village land for the construction of the Israeli settlement of Kokhav HaShahar.

In September 2005, hundreds of armed residents from Deir Jarir attacked the nearby town of Taybeh, which was provoked by a family feud. The feud was caused by a Christian man from Taybeh allegedly having intimate relations with a Muslim woman from Deir Jarir. The attack left 13 houses burnt, and three men were arrested (two from Deir Jarir and one from Taybeh). Despite the incident, the neighboring towns continue to have healthy relations; residents say "the people of Taybeh and the people of Deir Jarir are one family".

See also
Mitzpe Kramim, Israeli outpost built on private lands of Deir Jarir residents

References

Bibliography

  
 

 
 
 
 
 
'

External links
Welcome To Dayr Jarir
Deir Jarir, Welcome to Palestine
Survey of Western Palestine, Map 14: IAA, Wikimedia commons 
Deir Jarir Village (Fact Sheet), Applied Research Institute–Jerusalem (ARIJ)
Deir Jarir Village Profile, ARIJ
Aerial photo, ARIJ  
Locality Development Priorities and Needs in Deir Jarir Village, ARIJ
 Deir Jarir & Silwad: Two Palestinian villages Hammered by the Israeli Occupation 15, March, 2008, POICA
  Ufra Colonists Set Palestinian Fields Ablaze in Deir Jarir- Ramallah Governorate   24, September, 2011, POICA
Under the guise of legality: Israel's Declaration of State Land in the West Bank, February 2012, B'tselem

Villages in the West Bank